Dušek (feminine Dušková) is a Czech surname. Notable people with the surname include:

 Anna Dušková, Czech figure skater
 Antonín Dušek, Czech ice hockey player
 František Xaver Dušek, Czech composer
 Jaroslav Dušek, Czech actor
 Libuše Dušková, Czech linguist
 Marie Dušková, Czech poet
 Robert Dušek, Czech politician

See also
 14054 Dušek, main belt asteroid
 Duschek, Germanized version of the surname
 Dusík for the Czech surname Dusík and its variant Dussek

Czech-language surnames